DRACI PARS ŠUMPERK is an ice hockey team in Šumperk, Czech Republic. They played in the Czech 1.liga, the second level of ice hockey in the Czech Republic until the 2015-2016 season. They were relegated to 2.liga for the 2016-2017 season. The club was founded in 1942

Achievements
 Czech 2.liga champion: 1998, 1999, 2007, 2009, 2011.

References 

Šumperk 
2003 establishments in the Czech Republic
Ice hockey clubs established in 2003
Šumperk District
Sport in the Olomouc Region